Sierra Leone made its first and so far only Paralympic Games appearance at the 1996 Summer Paralympics in Atlanta, where it entered just one competitor in athletics. Kelley Marah, who was registered in four events but participated only in the javelin, and is the only person ever to have represented Sierra Leone at the Paralympic Games, did not win a medal.

Full results for Sierra Leone at the Paralympics

See also
 Sierra Leone at the Olympics

References